Brucedale is an unincorporated rural community in Guelph/Eramosa Township, Wellington County, Ontario, Canada.

The Guelph/Eramosa municipal office is located at the southwest boundary of Brucedale.

History
In 1907, a school was built on the Eramosa Gravel Road (later Ontario Highway 24, now County Road 124) on the south side of lot 14, concession 4, to serve School Section  10.  The school burned down in 1934, and was rebuilt that same year.  When the new Eramosa Public School opened farther up Fifth Line in 1965, the building was converted to Township offices.  The building was left vacant after the construction of a new municipal building for Eramosa Township next door, and was torn down in 2005.

Geography

References

Communities in Wellington County, Ontario